Nasrabad (also Romanized as Naşrābād; also known as Nasīrābād) is a village in Bala Khaf Rural District, Salami District, Khaf County, Razavi Khorasan Province, Iran. At the 2006 census, its population was 1,312, in 268 families.

References 

Populated places in Khaf County